During the 1998–99 Dutch football season, Willem II competed in the Eredivisie. Willem II achieved second place in the league, the club's best placement to date.

Season summary
Managed by Co Adriaanse, Willem II finished in fifth place in the 1997–98 Eredivisie, thereby securing qualification for the 1998–99 UEFA Cup. In the UEFA Cup's first round the club knocked out Georgian side Dinamo Tbilisi with two 3–0 wins. Willem II exited the competition in the second round, following a 1–1 draw and a 3–0 defeat against Spanish club Real Betis. In the 1998–99 KNVB Cup Willem II were knocked out in the first round by FC Zwolle with Geoffrey Prommayon scoring an own-goal in a game that finished 2–0.

Willem II achieved second place in the Eredivisie, the club's best placement to date, qualifying for the UEFA Champions League for the first time in the club's history. Argentina forward Mariano Bombarda was one of the most important players during the season, scoring 17 goals. At the winter break, Willem II was in 11th place. Thanks to a very successful run in the second half of the season, with only one defeat on the final day of the season against FC Twente, the club climbed to second place.

Willem II sold 10,000 season tickets for the season and drew a total of 204,780 spectators.

In May 1999, it was chosen as club of the season by the VVCS, the trade union of professional footballers in the Netherlands.

First-team squad

Transfers
Out
 Bert Konterman - Feyenoord
 Joonas Kolkka - PSV Eindhoven

Competitions

Eredivisie

League table

KNVB Cup

Results

UEFA Cup

Results

References

Willem II (football club) seasons
Willem II